USCGC Spar is the name of two United States Coast Guard buoy tenders:

 , commissioned in 1944, decommissioned in 1997 and scuttled
 , commissioned in 2001

United States Coast Guard ship names